Boronia wilsonii is an erect shrub that is endemic to northern Australia. Its branches, leaves and backs of the flowers are densely covered with woolly hairs. The petals are white to pink or burgundy-coloured.

Description
Young plants have a moderately dense covering of woolly, star-shaped hairs on the branches and leaves. Mature plants have a dense covering of woolly, star-shaped hairs on the branches, leaves and backs of the flowers.

Taxonomy and naming
This boronia was first formally described in 1863 by George Bentham from an unpublished description by Ferdinand von Mueller who gave it the name Boronia artemisiifolia var. wilsonii and published the description in Flora Australiensis. In 1997, Marco Duretto raised the variety to species status as Boronia wilsonii. The specific epithet (wilsonii) honours an early collector of the species, possibly geologist James Spottiswoode Wilson who participated, along with Mueller, in Augustus Charles Gregory's 1855-1856 expedition to the northern interior.

Distribution and habitat
Boronia wilsonii is common in the Kimberley region and nearby islands where it grows mostly in near-coastal areas in sandy soil over sandstone. There are also a few collections from the lower Victoria River in the Northern Territory.

Conservation status
This species is classified as "not threatened" by the Western Australian Government Department of Parks and Wildlife and as "near threatened" under the Territory Parks and Wildlife Conservation Act 2000.

References 

wilsonii
Rosids of Western Australia
Flora of the Northern Territory
Plants described in 1863
Taxa named by George Bentham